A Night to Remember is the eighth studio album by American country music artist Joe Diffie. It was released on June 1, 1999, through Epic Records. It is his last album released by Epic. The album contains the singles "A Night to Remember", "The Quittin' Kind", and "It's Always Somethin'", which respectively reached #6, #21, and #5 on the Billboard country charts. The title track was also Diffie's highest entry on the Billboard Hot 100, reaching #38 there. The song "I'm the Only Thing (I'll Hold Against You)" was originally recorded by Conway Twitty on his Final Touches album. "Don't Our Love Look Natural" was originally recorded by Keith Whitley.

Track listing

Personnel
Sam Bush – mandolin
Mark Casstevens – acoustic guitar
Joe Diffie – lead vocals, background vocals
Larry Franklin – fiddle
Paul Franklin – steel guitar
David Hungate – bass guitar
John Barlow Jarvis – piano, Hammond B-3 organ, Wurlitzer
Tim Lauer – Hammond B-3 organ, keyboards
Liana Manis – background vocals
Brent Mason – electric guitar, gut string guitar, tic tac bass
Steve Nathan – piano, keyboards, Hammond B-3 organ
Tom Roady – percussion
Brent Rowan – electric guitar
Lonnie Wilson – drums, percussion, background vocals
Glenn Worf – bass guitar

Chart performance

1999 albums
Joe Diffie albums
Epic Records albums
Albums produced by Don Cook